La flûte magique (en. The Magic Flute) (ru. «Волшебная флейта», Volshebnaya Fleita) is a ballet comique in one act, originally choreographed by Lev Ivanov to the music of Riccardo Drigo. Although it has the same title as Mozart's opera The Magic Flute, the two works have no other connection.

History 
La flûte magique was originally created for the graduation performance of students of the Imperial Ballet School. The ballet served as a useful vehicle for the ballerinas of the Tsarist stage including Anna Pavlova, who would later include the work in the repertory of her own touring company. 

Riccardo Drigo's score was later published in piano reduction and orchestral partition by the music publisher Zimmerman in 1912. The score was recorded in 1990 by the Orchestra of the Royal Opera House, Covent Garden, conducted by Richard Bonynge and issued on the label London.

The ballet has been re-staged in several versions, notably by Peter Martins for the School of American Ballet. This production was first presented on 9 May 1981. A second premiere was given by the New York City Ballet on 21 January 1982, at the New York State Theater, Lincoln Center with décor designed by David Mitchell and costumes by Ben Benson.

Program 
List of scenes and dances from The Magic Flute taken from the published piano score and the original program of 1893. 

Ballet comique in one act
 no.01 Danse villageoise
 no.02 Pas d'action
 no.03 Scène et danse forcée (ancien air de ballet d'auter inconnu)
 no.04 Pas de deux
 no.05 Grand ballabile —
a. Grand adage
b. Variation pour quatre danseuses
c. Variation de Luc (M. Mikhail Fokine)
d. Pizzicato de Lise (Mlle. Stanislava Belinskaya)
e. Grand ballabile

See also
 List of ballets by title

References

Ballets by Peter Martins
Ballets by Riccardo Drigo
1981 ballet premieres
Ballets designed by David Mitchell
Ballets designed by Ben Benson
Ballets designed by Ronald Bates